Othaya is a Kenyan town about 120 kilometres north of Nairobi, the capital. It has a population of 21,427, of which 4,108 are core urban (1999 census ); the majority of the residents are of the Kikuyu tribe. Othaya is part of the Nyeri County. It is an agricultural area with coffee and tea as the main cash crops. Main crop grown in the area are Tea and coffee, while most farmers are subsistence. Othaya is home to Chinga dam, the largest water reservoir in the Nyeri County.

Mwai Kibaki, the third President of Kenya, was born in Gatuyaini, a village in Othaya.

Othaya forms a town council, which has five wards: Kanyange, Kianganda, Nduye River, Nyamari and Thuti. All of them are part of Othaya Constituency. Othaya is also the headquarters of Othaya administrative division, which has four locations: Chinga, Iria-Ini, Karima and Mahiga. Othaya division has a population of 88,291 (1999 census). Othaya division has common borders with Othaya constituency, which Mwai Kibaki represented in parliament up to 2013. The current member of parliament is Hon Gichuki Mugambi elected in 2017 general elections. Stellamaris Othaya Girls High School is also situated in Othaya alongside Chinga Boys High School and many other schools.

References 

Nyeri County
Populated places in Central Province (Kenya)